The 2018–19 FC Girondins de Bordeaux season was the 138th professional season of the club since its creation in 1881. Bordeaux finished their 2017–18 season in 6th place, qualifying for the UEFA Europa League.

Players

On loan

Transfers

In

Loans in

Out

Loans out

Competitions

Overall

Ligue 1

League table

Results summary

Results by round

Matches

Coupe de France

Coupe de la Ligue

UEFA Europa League

Second qualifying round

Third qualifying round

Play-off round

Group stage

Statistics

Appearances and goals

|-
! colspan=14 style=background:#dcdcdc; text-align:center| Goalkeepers

|-
! colspan=14 style=background:#dcdcdc; text-align:center| Defenders

|-
! colspan=14 style=background:#dcdcdc; text-align:center| Midfielders

|-
! colspan=14 style=background:#dcdcdc; text-align:center| Forwards

|-
! colspan=14 style=background:#dcdcdc; text-align:center| Players transferred out during the season

References

FC Girondins de Bordeaux seasons
Bordeaux
Girondins de Bordeaux